CQA may refer to:
 CQA Four Mile Bridge, in Hot Springs County, Wyoming
 Caffeoylquinic acid, the name of various acids
 Certified Quality Auditor, a professional auditor certification
 Columbia Queer Alliance, a Columbia University student organization
 Community question-answering, in social information seeking
 Critical quality attributes, a term from pharmaceutical manufacturing